Firemen's Hall is a historic meeting hall located in the College Point section of the New York City borough of Queens.  It was built in 1906-1907 and is a two-story, rectangular brick building with a hipped roof in the Queen Anne style. A small rear addition was built about 1936. It was built for the Exempt Firemen's Benevolent Association of College Point. Although owned by the College Point Little League, the building is used by a number of community groups as a meeting and social hall.

It was listed on the National Register of Historic Places in 2000.

References

Clubhouses on the National Register of Historic Places in New York City
Queen Anne architecture in New York City
Buildings and structures completed in 1907
Clubhouses in Queens, New York
National Register of Historic Places in Queens, New York